Smith Fork is a stream in Hardin County in the U.S. state of Tennessee.

Variant names were "Smiths Creek" and "Smiths Fork". Smith Fork has the name of a pioneer settler. 

References

Rivers of Hardin County, Tennessee
Rivers of Tennessee